Ralph Elmer Wilson (April 14, 1886 – March 25, 1960) was an American astronomer.

Wilson was born in Cincinnati, Ohio, the son of Herbert Couper Wilson and Mary B. Nichols. He earned his B.A. from Carleton College and entered the University of Virginia in 1906, where he earned his Ph.D. in 1910 based on his work at the Leander Mccormick Observatory working with Ormond Stone. He then worked at the Dudley Observatory, then at the Lick southern station in Santiago, Chile in 1913, and by 1939 at the Mount Wilson Observatory. In 1929 he became the associate editor of the Astronomical Journal. He was elected to the National Academy of Sciences in 1950.

He published multiple papers on stellar absolute magnitudes, proper motions, and radial velocities of various stars, along with binary star systems and orbital derivations of spectroscopic binaries. Among his publications was the General Catalogue of Stellar Radial Velocities in 1953.

The crater Wilson on the Moon is co-named for him, Alexander Wilson and Charles T. R. Wilson.

References

1886 births
1960 deaths
American astronomers
University of Virginia alumni
Members of the United States National Academy of Sciences